Chilcoot is an unincorporated community in Plumas County, California.

For census purposes, Chilcoot is included in the census-designated place (CDP) of Chilcoot-Vinton.

The Chilcoot post office opened in 1898, was moved into Lassen County in 1909, and moved back into Plumas County in 1910. Chilcoot may be a Shawnee language name.

Climate
This region experiences warm (but not hot) and dry summers, with no average monthly temperatures above 71.6 °F.  According to the Köppen Climate Classification system, Chilcoot has a warm-summer Mediterranean climate, abbreviated "Csb" on climate maps.

References

Unincorporated communities in California
Unincorporated communities in Plumas County, California